ESSA-I may refer to:
 ESSA-1, the first ESSA satellite
 ESSA-9, the ninth ESSA satellite